Kurt Vonnegut's Monkey House is a Canadian television anthology series which aired on the Showtime network from 1991 to 1993. Author Kurt Vonnegut hosted the series himself, presenting dramatizations of several of his short stories from the 1968 collection Welcome to the Monkey House.

Episodes
Each Monkey House adaptation was 30 minutes long.

The first three stories were produced as a television pilot in British Columbia, Canada, and broadcast together from 9:00–10:30pm on May 12, 1991. The four subsequent episodes were filmed and produced in New Zealand in 1992, as a co-production with South Pacific Pictures. The latter episodes were broadcast monthly.

Season 1

Season 2

References

External links

1990s Canadian anthology television series
Showtime (TV network) original programming
Works by Kurt Vonnegut
1991 Canadian television series debuts
1993 Canadian television series endings
1990s Canadian drama television series
1990s New Zealand television series
Television shows filmed in British Columbia
Television series by South Pacific Pictures